Andriy Kornyev (born 1 November 1978) is a Ukrainian football manager and professional football defender who is a playing coach for Obolon-2 Bucha.

Career
Graduating for the Dynamo Kyiv Youth Academy, Kornyev was promoted to Dynamo-3 playing in the lower leagues. Spotted by Obolon Kyiv he moved there, followed by a transfer to FC Systema-Boreks in Borodyanka. Soon Kornyev relocated outside of Kyiv Oblast to Kharkiv in FC Arsenal Kharkiv.

Kornyev moved to Tavriya in 2004. In SC Tavriya Simferopol he played 64 games and scored 3 goals. In January 2007, he was purchased by Chornomorets Odessa. At age 30, Kornyev returned to Tavria in January 2009 with only three goals scored in the Top League.

References

External links
 Profile on Official Chornomorets Website

1985 births
Living people
Ukrainian footballers
Association football defenders
Footballers from Kyiv
FC Dynamo-3 Kyiv players
FC Obolon-Brovar Kyiv players
FC Obolon-2 Kyiv players
FC Systema-Boreks Borodianka players
FC Chornomorets Odesa players
SC Tavriya Simferopol players
FC Arsenal Kharkiv players
Ukrainian Premier League players
Ukrainian First League players
Ukrainian Second League players